Pennsylvania State Senate District 20 includes parts of Luzerne County and Wayne County and all of Pike County, Susquehanna County, and Wyoming County. It is currently represented by Republican Lisa Baker.

District profile
The district includes the following areas:

Luzerne County

 Ashley
 Courtdale
 Dallas
 Dallas Township
 Edwardsville
 Exeter
 Exeter Township
 Fairmount Township
 Forty Fort
 Franklin Township
 Hanover Township
 Harveys Lake
 Hunlock Township
 Jackson Township
 Kingston
 Kingston Township
 Lake Township
 Larksville
 Lehman Township
 Luzerne
 Nanticoke
 Newport Township
 Plymouth
 Plymouth Township
 Pringle
 Ross Township
 Sugar Notch
 Swoyersville
 Union Township
 Warrior Run
 West Wyoming

All of Pike County

All of Susquehanna County

Wayne County

 Berlin Township
 Bethany
 Buckingham Township
 Clinton Township
 Damascus Township
 Dyberry Township
 Hawley
 Lebanon Township
 Manchester Township
 Mount Pleasant Township
 Oregon Township
 Palmyra Township
 Paupack Township
 Preston Township
 Scott Township
 Starrucca

All of Wyoming County

Senators

References

Pennsylvania Senate districts
Government of Luzerne County, Pennsylvania
Government of Pike County, Pennsylvania
Government of Susquehanna County, Pennsylvania
Government of Wayne County, Pennsylvania
Government of Wyoming County, Pennsylvania